USCGC John McCormick (WPC-1121) is the United States Coast Guard's 21st  cutter, and the first to be stationed in Alaska, where homeported at Coast Guard Base Ketchikan.

The vessel's manufacturer, Bollinger Shipyards, of Lockport, Louisiana, delivered the ship to the Coast Guard on December 13, 2016, for her acceptance trials, and then John McCormick was commissioned on April 12, 2017 in Ketchikan, Alaska.

Mission

The Sentinel-class cutters are lightly armed patrol vessels with a crew of approximately two dozen sailors, capable of traveling almost 3,000 nautical miles, on five day missions. The cutter is a multi-mission vessel intended to perform law enforcement, search and rescue, fisheries and environmental protection, and homeland security tasks. Houma Today quoted Ben Bordelon, Bollinger's CEO, that John McCormick will ""assist in defending our nation's interests in the Alaskan maritime region.""

Operational history

On March 12, 2017, John McCormick stopped in Astoria, Oregon, on its way to its commissioning in Ketchikan.  The Coast Guard invited Astoria residents to tour the vessel.  The Daily Astorian reported that the Coast Guard was considering stationing two Sentinel-class cutters in either Astoria or Newport, Oregon.

The vessel arrived in Ketchikan, Alaska on March 17, 2017.  The Ketchikan fireboat, and smaller coast guard vessels, escorted her to her moorings.  She was commissioned on April 12, 2017.  Five other Sentinel-class cutters will be based in Alaska, including the USCGC Bailey T. Barco in Ketchikan.

Charles Michel, the Coast Guard's Vice Commandant, attended the vessel's commissioning ceremony on April 12, 2017.  He published an op-ed in the Juneau Empire celebrating the improvements the cutter offered over earlier models.  He explained how important the cutter, the five sister ships that will join her patrolling Alaska's water, will be for the Alaskan economy.

On September 23, 2020, the John F. McCormick proceeded to Hoonah, Alaska, on a rescue mission.  Her crew rescued the crew of a fishing vessel that was stranded on rocks there, and were able to tow the vessel back to port.

Namesake

In 2010, Charles "Skip" W. Bowen, who was then the United States Coast Guard's most senior non-commissioned officer, proposed that all 58 cutters in the Sentinel class should be named after enlisted sailors in the Coast Guard, or one of its precursor services, who were recognized for their heroism.  In 2014 the Coast Guard announced that John F. McCormick, a Coast Guard seaman who earned a Gold Lifesaving Medal for saving the life of fellow Coast Guard sailor, Richard O. Bracken, off Clatsop Spit, near the treacherous Columbia River bar, would be the namesake of the 21st cutter.

Accolades 
On Jan 11th, 2018, the Douglas Munro Chapter of the Surface Navy Association awarded the crew of the Coast Guard Cutter John McCormick with the 2017 Hopley Yeaton Cutter Excellence Award (small cutter) in conjunction with the 2018 Surface Navy Association National Symposium in Washington, D.C. The John McCormick was awarded top honors over more than 150 cutters in the “Small Cutter (175′ or less)” category. To merit this award, the cutter distinguished itself from other units through exceptional performance in categories including, but not limited to:

1. Operations and mission accomplishment

2. Cutter training and readiness

3. Engineering

4. Impact to the Fleet and examples of accomplishments for this cutter

5. Commitment to crew and families

As the first Fast Response Cutter (FRC) assigned to Coast Guard District 17, cutter John McCormick was recognized for setting high standards in crew readiness and training. This training ensured John McCormick’s safe and timely transit of more than 6,000 nautical miles from Key West, Florida, to its homeport in Ketchikan, Alaska, and the crew’s rapid response to engineering and damage control casualties along the way. The John McCormick was also recognized for being an immediate asset to D17 where the crew conducted 77 fisheries boardings, saving or assisting 10 lives and more than $1 million in property and developed close bonds with the community.

“It is truly an honor for the crew of the John McCormick to be recognized for this prestigious award, especially considering the accomplishments over this calendar year, which included transiting to Ketchikan from Key West, getting commissioned in April, and serving the great state of Alaska ever since,” said Lt. Mike Moyseowicz, commanding officer of the cutter John McCormick. “More than anything, this award is about the crew, all of whom sacrificed so many nights away from home in service to their country, and none of this would have been possible without their exceptional professionalism, teamwork, and dedication to serving others.”

The Cutter John McCormick is a 154-foot Fast Response Cutter homeported in Ketchikan, Alaska. It has a crew of 25.

References

Sentinel-class cutters
Ships of the United States Coast Guard
2016 ships
Ships built in Lockport, Louisiana